Renato Cardoso Porto Neto (born 27 September 1991) is a Brazilian professional footballer who plays as a midfielder.

Club career

Sporting CP
Born in Camacan, Bahia, Neto started his career in Academia Catarinense de Futebol, a small team based in Santa Catarina where he was spotted by Sporting CP at the age of 16, going on to be part of the club's junior teams that won three national championships in a row.

Neto made his debut for the Lions first team on 24 May 2009, featuring four minutes in a 3–1 home win over C.D. Nacional after replacing compatriot Derlei. His second Primeira Liga appearance came one year later, against Leixões SC (one minute played).

After graduating from Sporting's academy, Neto was loaned to Cercle Brugge K.S.V. in Belgium alongside teammate Nuno Reis. In his only full season in the Pro League, he scored four goals in 36 matches (32 starts) as the team finished in ninth position.

In late December 2011, as Sporting were facing an injury crisis in midfield, Neto was recalled by the club's manager Domingos Paciência. In the ensuing summer he was loaned again, now to Hungary's Videoton FC, leaving for K.A.A. Gent in the following transfer window also on loan.

Gent
Gent acquired Neto on a permanent basis for the 2014–15 campaign. On 21 May 2015, through a penalty kick, he was one of two players on target as his team defeated Standard Liège 2–0 at home to be crowned champions for the first time in their history.

Neto nearly completed a transfer to newly-promoted Premier League club Brighton & Hove Albion in 2017, but failed a medical. He missed the entire 2017–18 due to a serious knee injury.

Oostende
On 20 May 2019, Neto joined K.V. Oostende on a one-year contract.

Club statistics

HonoursGent'
Belgian Pro League: 2014–15
Belgian Super Cup: 2015

References

External links

1991 births
Living people
Sportspeople from Bahia
Brazilian footballers
Association football midfielders
Primeira Liga players
Sporting CP footballers
Belgian Pro League players
Challenger Pro League players
Cercle Brugge K.S.V. players
K.A.A. Gent players
K.V. Oostende players
K.M.S.K. Deinze players
Nemzeti Bajnokság I players
Fehérvár FC players
Maltese Premier League players
Sirens F.C. players
Brazilian expatriate footballers
Expatriate footballers in Portugal
Expatriate footballers in Belgium
Expatriate footballers in Hungary
Expatriate footballers in Malta
Brazilian expatriate sportspeople in Portugal
Brazilian expatriate sportspeople in Belgium
Brazilian expatriate sportspeople in Hungary
Brazilian expatriate sportspeople in Malta